İncedere is a village in the district of Şiran, Gümüşhane Province, Turkey.  The population is 542 people.

External links 
  Website of Özincedere village

Villages in Gümüşhane Province